In mathematics, the Walter theorem, proved by ,  describes the finite groups whose Sylow 2-subgroup is abelian.  used Bender's method to give a simpler proof.

Statement
Walter's theorem states that if G is a finite group whose 2-sylow subgroups are abelian, then G/O(G) has a normal subgroup of odd index that is a product of groups each of which is a 2-group or one of the simple groups PSL2(q) for q = 2n or q = 3 or 5 mod 8, or the Janko group J1, or Ree groups 2G2(32n+1).  (Here O(G) denotes the unique largest normal subgroup of G of
odd order.)

The original statement of Walter's theorem did not quite identify the Ree groups, but only stated that the corresponding groups have a similar  subgroup structure as Ree groups.  and  later showed that they are all Ree groups, and  gave a unified exposition of this result.

References

Theorems about finite groups